Richard Gutzschbach, real name Richard Gutzschebauch (1840 – 4 November 1921) was a German operatic baritone.

Life 
Gutzschbach was born in Großstorkwitz. According to his parents' wishes, he was to become a teacher and, after completing the relevant studies, worked as such for a long time at the higher citizens' school in Chemnitz.

His voice prompted him to give up teaching and study singing in Dresden at the Hochschule für Musik Carl Maria von Weber Dresden with Professor Gustav Scharfe.

After completing his studies, he was immediately engaged at the Saxon Court Theatre in 1866, where he worked for almost 40 years.

He was considered a great Wagner interpreter.

Gutzschbach died in Dreden in his 80s.

Further reading 
 Ludwig Eisenberg: Großes biographisches Lexikon der Deutschen Bühne im XIX. Jahrhundert. Verlag von Paul List publishing house, Leipzig 1903,.
 : Wer ist’s? H. A. Ludwig Degener publishing house, Leipzig, 1909, .

References

External links 
 

German operatic baritones
1840 births
1921 deaths
People from Pegau